Noah Hughes Palmer (born April 21, 1983) is an American soccer goalkeeper.

Palmer played college soccer at University of Maryland from 2001 to 2004, finishing his collegiate career with a school-record 34 shutouts and a GAA of 0.86. He also played in the USL Premier Development League for Chesapeake Dragons and his hometown team, Williamsburg Legacy.

He was drafted in the third round, 25th overall, by Real Salt Lake in the 2005 MLS Supplemental Draft.  He would miss the entire 2005 season with shoulder surgery.

On May 29, 2006 Palmer was traded to the Columbus Crew for Duke Hashimoto.  He played 10 games over the course of the season but was waived during the 2007 pre-season.

References

1983 births
Living people
American soccer players
Maryland Terrapins men's soccer players
Legacy 76 players
Chesapeake Dragons players
Major League Soccer players
Real Salt Lake players
Columbus Crew players
USL League Two players
Real Salt Lake draft picks
Soccer players from Virginia
Association football goalkeepers